Sudoměřice u Tábora is a municipality and village in Tábor District in the South Bohemian Region of the Czech Republic. It has about 300 inhabitants.

Notable people
Josef Fanta (1856–1954), architect

Gallery

References

Villages in Tábor District